Beth Madsen (born March 12, 1964) is an American former alpine skier. She competed in the women's slalom and women's combined events at the 1988 Winter Olympics.

External links
 sports-reference.com

1964 births
Living people
American female alpine skiers
Olympic alpine skiers of the United States
Alpine skiers at the 1988 Winter Olympics
Sportspeople from Aspen, Colorado
21st-century American women